The Aeropilot Legend 540 is a Czech ultralight aircraft, designed and produced by Aeropilot,  introduced at the Aero show held in Friedrichshafen in 2011. The aircraft is supplied complete and ready-to-fly-aircraft.

Design and development
The Legend 540 is a scale two-seat version of the Cessna 182, rendered in composites, instead of sheet metal.

The aircraft was designed to comply with the Fédération Aéronautique Internationale microlight rules. It features a strut-braced high-wing, a two-seats-in-side-by-side configuration enclosed cockpit, tricycle landing gear  and a single engine in tractor configuration.

The aircraft is made from carbon fibre. Its  span wing employs flaps. Standard engines available are the  Rotax 912ULS and the  Jabiru 2200 four-stroke powerplants.

Specifications (Legend 540)

References

External links

2010s Czech ultralight aircraft
Single-engined tractor aircraft
Replica aircraft